Kipling Christian Moore (born April 2, 1980) is an American country music singer and songwriter signed to MCA Nashville. He has released a total of four studio albums for the label: Up All Night, Wild Ones, Slowheart, and Wild World. Moore has charted a total of twelve entries on Billboard Hot Country Songs and Country Airplay including the number-one "Somethin' 'Bout a Truck" and four additional top-ten hits. He has also written songs for Frankie Ballard, Thompson Square, and James Wesley.

Biography
Kip Moore was born in Tifton, Georgia, to Bonnie (Mann) and Stan Moore. He has two brothers and three sisters. Their father died in September 2011, just months before the release of Moore's debut album. He began playing guitar while attending Wallace State Community College in Hanceville, Alabama, and made his first public performance at a Mellow Mushroom restaurant in Valdosta, Georgia. After college, he moved to a "little hut" in Hawaii, where he also took up backpacking and surfing. He moved to Nashville, Tennessee, in 2004, where songwriter and producer Brett James helped him sign a publishing deal.

Musical career
He spent eight years in Nashville before signing a record deal with MCA Nashville. His debut single, "Mary Was the Marrying Kind", peaked at number 45 on the country singles charts published by Billboard.

On September 27, 2011, he released his second single, "Somethin' 'Bout a Truck". The song was followed by the release of his debut album Up All Night in April 2012. Moore co-wrote every song on the album, and Brett James produced it. A month later, "Somethin' 'Bout a Truck" hit number 1 on the Billboard country charts. "Beer Money" was the album's second single, followed by "Hey Pretty Girl". These songs also reached the country Top 5. Up All Night was the most commercially successful album for a debut country male artist in both 2012 and 2013.

Moore co-wrote two tracks on Thompson Square's self-titled debut album which was released in February 2011: "All the Way" and "Let's Fight", the latter of which was their debut single. He also co-wrote James Wesley's 2012 single "Walking Contradiction". He also co-wrote Frankie Ballard's 2016 single "Cigarette".

Wild Ones (2013–2016)
In October 2013, Moore announced his fifth single, "Young Love". It charted at number 22 on the Country Airplay in March 2014. After it underperformed, it was followed by "Dirt Road", which failed to make Top 40. Moore then decided to "scrap" his second album and compose new material. Moore then released "I'm to Blame", the lead single to his 2015 album, Wild Ones.

Slowheart (2017–2018)

On February 10, 2017, Moore released "More Girls Like You" as the lead single from a then-unannounced forthcoming album.

On June 21, 2017, Moore announced the album's title, Slowheart, and its release date of September 8, 2017.

On November 16, 2018, Moore released his second EP titled Room to Spare: The Acoustic Sessions. Three singles were released in preparation for the EP: "Tennessee Boy," an acoustic version of "Plead the Fifth," and "It Ain't California." The EP consists of seven acoustic tracks.

Wild World (2019–2022)

In May 2019, Moore announced on social media "That's a wrap, record #4 is done". No release date had been officially announced, but on June 15 Moore announced he was checking mixes for his upcoming record, indicating the record may be released sometime in 2019.

On August 9, 2019, Moore released a much-anticipated lead single to his yet to be named upcoming album. "She's Mine" is a song Moore wrote over a decade ago, and finally released it in 2019.

On March 27, 2020, Moore released the title track for his anticipated fourth studio album titled Wild World. Later that same day, Moore did an interview with Billboard about his new album. The album, which consists of thirteen tracks (twelve of which are co-written by Moore), was released on May 29, 2020. Another preview song, "Southpaw", followed on April 17, 2020.

In January 2022, Moore released a re-recorded version of "Crazy One More Time", which was previously featured as an album track on Up All Night. The new version was sent to country radio on January 24, 2022.

Damn Love (2023-present)

On February 24, 2023, Moore released the first single of his fifth studio album titled "Damn Love." The album of the same name will be released on April 28, 2023.

Personal life
In his free time, Moore enjoys carpentry, surfing rock climbing and hiking. Moore co-manages a lodging facility for outdoor enthusiasts in Rogers, Kentucky.

Moore has never been married and has no children. He stated that "...it's not like I'm out doing really wild stuff. It's just that my focus has been so hyper-driven on the music that even when I'm off the road I'm always back in the studio writing and creating." "I've been a boyfriend maybe three or four times in my whole life. I hang out here and there, but I'm that kind of that person who longs for so much solo time, freedom, alone time. It does seem like a lot of guys my age in this business are getting married, but I'll probably be the last bachelor standing!"

Discography

 Up All Night (2012)
 Wild Ones (2015)
 Slowheart (2017)
 Wild World (2020)
 Damn Love (2023)

Awards and nominations

References

External links 
 

1980 births
21st-century American composers
21st-century American guitarists
21st-century American singers
21st-century American writers
American country guitarists
American country singer-songwriters
American male guitarists
American male singer-songwriters
Country musicians from Georgia (U.S. state)
Country musicians from Tennessee
Living people
MCA Records artists
People from Tifton, Georgia
Singers from Nashville, Tennessee
Wallace State Community College alumni
Guitarists from Georgia (U.S. state)
Guitarists from Tennessee
21st-century American male singers
Singer-songwriters from Tennessee
Singer-songwriters from Georgia (U.S. state)